The rufous-winged illadopsis (Illadopsis rufescens) is a species of bird in the family Pellorneidae. It is found in Benin, Ivory Coast, Ghana, Guinea, Liberia, Senegal, Sierra Leone, and Togo. Its natural habitats are subtropical or tropical moist lowland forest and subtropical or tropical moist montane forest. It is threatened by habitat loss.

References

rufous-winged illadopsis
Birds of West Africa
rufous-winged illadopsis
Taxonomy articles created by Polbot